Gatunguru is a village in Muranga County, mathioya subcounty, njumbi division, Gatunguru sublocation of Kenya.

References 

Populated places in Central Province (Kenya)